Haydn Keeton (26 October 1847, in Mosborough – 27 May 1921, in Peterborough) was a cathedral organist, who served at Peterborough Cathedral.

Background

Haydn Keeton was born in Mosborough. His father Edwin Keeton was organist at Eckington Parish Church. He was a chorister at St. George's Chapel, Windsor Castle, where he studied with George Elvey. He received his B. Mus. (1869) and D. Mus. from Oxford (1877). He became the organist and choir master at Peterborough in 1870, where he also conducted the local orchestral society for 25 years and the Choral Union for 20 years.

Some of his more famous pupils include Alfred Whitehead, Malcolm Sargent, and Thomas Armstrong.

His compositions include a Symphony for orchestra, organ voluntaries, piano pieces, songs, services, psalm chants, and anthems including "Give ear, Lord, unto my prayer" (Meadowcroft Prize); also wrote a singing method (London, 1892).

He is buried in Peterborough Cathedral.

Career

Organist of:
Datchet Parish Church 1867 - 1870
Peterborough Cathedral 1870 - 1921

References

19th-century organists
English classical organists
British male organists
Cathedral organists
1870 births
1921 deaths
People from Mosborough
20th-century organists
20th-century British male musicians
19th-century British male musicians
Male classical organists